Dušan Janićijević may refer to:

 Dušan Janićijević (actor) (1932–2011), Serbian actor
 Dušan Janićijević (athlete) (born 1955), Serbian former long-distance runner